Marian Rada (born 14 May 1960) is a Romanian former football defender and currently a manager.

Career 
He started to play in the country's second division (Liga II) in 1981, for Autobuzul Bucharest. After he spent two seasons in Liga II, he was transferred to Rapid Bucharest, where he found great success. After three years played in top division with Rapid Bucharest, he moved to Universitatea Craiova, where he played only for one season. In 1987, he came back to his soul club – Rapid Bucharest, where he played for another four years, after that he retired.

Coaching career 
In 1991, after he retired, he was started a new career, as manager. After three years of preparation, he started as assistant manager at the first team of Rapid Bucharest. After that was followed a long period when he was assistant manager at the first team, manager at the second team, manager on the club academy or even director of the club.

In March 2008, after the resignation of Mircea Rednic, Rada took for the very first time the post of principal manager. He survived in that position 9 rounds, until the end of the season, when he was replaced with Jose Peseiro. The next season, he started as principal manager on the Rapid Bucharest II, in the third division.

In January 2009, after an unsatisfying first part of the season for the first team, Rada was recalled to the first team. He managed the club together with Adrian Iencsi (which is assistant manager and player in the same time) and Grigore Sichitiu (technical director).

After 15 years on 18 April 2009 has quit Rapid Bucharest after Wednesday's 2–4 defeat against Dinamo Bucharest in the Romanian Cup quarter finals. His place was taken by the former assistant coach Adrian Iencsi.

In October 2012, Rada was reinstalled as the head coach of Rapid. He was sacked at the end of the season.

In September 2014, Rada took again the control of Rapid. His contract was ended by mutual agreement in December 2014.

Honours

Player
Rapid București
Divizia B: 1989–90

References

External links 

1960 births
Living people
Footballers from Bucharest
Romanian footballers
AFC Rocar București players
FC Rapid București players
FC U Craiova 1948 players
Liga I players
Liga II players
Romania international footballers
Romanian football managers
FC Rapid București managers
Association football midfielders